Marc Guy Albert Marie Lacroix (born 28 April 1963 in Verviers, Wallonia, Belgium) is a biochemist (educated at University of Liège) and a researcher who specializes in breast cancer biology, metastasis and therapy.

He works at Institut Jules Bordet (Brussels, Belgium). He lives in Baelen

Earlier work 
Breast cancer cells (BCC) frequently metastasize to the skeleton, where they lead to tumor-induced osteolysis and subsequent morbidity. Marc Lacroix has investigated the interrelationships between BCC and bone cells (osteoblasts, the bone-building cells, and osteoclasts, the bone-degrading cells). With colleagues, he discovered that BCC produce soluble factors increasing osteoclast activity, notably interleukin-11, the production of which is reduced by the cyclooxygenase inhibitor aspirin. BCC also reduce the proliferation of osteoblasts and their production of collagen, the main protein component of bone. Marc Lacroix also examined the response BCC to the anti-osteolytic agent calcitonin

In close collaboration with Prof. Guy Leclercq (Laboratoire Jean-Claude Heuson de Cancérologie Mammaire, Institut Jules Bordet, Belgium), Marc Lacroix has studied various aspects of estrogen receptor biology, ligand-binding and transcriptional activity, and life-cycle.

Recent work 
The amount of data on breast cancer available for the scientific and medical community is growing rapidly. According to PubMed, a search engine offering access to the MEDLINE database of citations and abstracts of biomedical research articles, 7918 papers containing the expression «breast cancer» were published in 2006. Their number was 3592 in 1996, 1455 in 1986 and only 626 in 1976.  In general, the older information is overlaid by more recent data and forgotten to some extent. In 2004, Lacroix and colleagues collected and assembled data from hundreds of articles related to the biology, pathology and genetics of in situ, invasive and metastatic breast cancers. These papers were covering a time period of about 25 years. Lacroix et al. concluded that despite undergoing increasing genetic alteration, most individual breast cancers rather surprisingly maintain their phenotype when they evolve from in situ to the metastatic state. This conclusion was in opposition to a progression model widely accepted at that time, which was suggesting that carcinoma in situ could evolve into invasive carcinoma and subsequently produce metastases through an accumulation of molecular abnormalities possibly allowing extensive phenotype changes and subsequent gain of aggressiveness.

Bibliography: articles in scientific and medical journals (excerpt)

Bibliography: collaborative books – invited chapters 
 Leclercq G, Lacroix M, Seo HS, Larsimont D. "Mechanisms regulating oestrogen receptor alpha expression in breast cancer.", in "Molecular Mechanisms of Action of Steroid Hormone Receptors" 65–75 (2002). Editors: Marija Krstic-Demonacos & Constantinos Demonacos, Research Signpost Publishers, Trivandrum, India, https://web.archive.org/web/20070217105555/http://www.ressign.com/

 Sotiriou C, Desmedt C, Durbecq V, Dal Lago L, Lacroix M, Cardoso F, Piccart M. "Genomic and molecular classification of breast cancer.", in "Molecular Oncology of Breast Cancer"  81–95 (2004). Editors: Jeffrey S. Ross and Gabriel N. Hortobagy, Jones and Bartlett Publishers, 40 Tall Pine Drive, Sudbury, MA 01776 USA, http://www.jbpub.com/catalog/0763748102/table_of_contents.htm

Bibliography: books 
 Lacroix M. Tumor suppressor genes in breast cancer (2008). Nova Science Publishers, Inc, 400 Oser Ave, Ste 1600, Hauppauge, NY 11788-3635 USA, https://www.novapublishers.com/catalog/product_info.php?products_id=6866, 
 Lacroix M. Molecular therapy of breast cancer: classicism meets modernity (2009). Nova Science Publishers, Inc, 400 Oser Ave, Ste 1600, Hauppauge, NY 	11788-3635 USA, https://www.novapublishers.com/catalog/product_info.php?products_id=10042, 
 Lacroix M. MicroRNAs in breast cancer (2010). Nova Science Publishers, Inc, 400 Oser Ave, Ste 1600, Hauppauge, NY 11788-3635 USA, https://www.novapublishers.com/catalog/product_info.php?products_id=12776, 
 Lacroix M. A concise history of breast cancer (2011, 2013). Nova Science Publishers, Inc, 400 Oser Ave, Ste 1600, Hauppauge, NY 11788-3635 USA, https://www.novapublishers.com/catalog/product_info.php?cPath=23_132_105&products_id=18309,  (2011), https://www.novapublishers.com/catalog/product_info.php?products_id=40565&osCsid=eab93c77d43f686ab6e8108d41306b3c (2013)
 Lacroix M. Coding for disease: genes and cancer (2013). Nova Science Publishers, Inc, 400 Oser Ave, Ste 1600, Hauppauge, NY 11788-3635 USA, https://www.novapublishers.com/catalog/product_info.php?products_id=41346, 
 Lacroix M. Targeted therapies in cancer (2014). Nova Science Publishers, Inc, 400 Oser Ave, Ste 1600, Hauppauge, NY 11788-3635 USA, https://www.novapublishers.com/catalog/product_info.php?products_id=50896, 
 Lacroix M. Targeted therapies in cancer: an update (2016). Nova Science Publishers, Inc, 400 Oser Ave, Ste 1600, Hauppauge, NY 11788-3635 USA, https://www.novapublishers.com/catalog/product_info.php?products_id=57553,

References
Over the years, Marc Lacroix has been refereeing for several international scientific and clinical journals:
 Acta Pharmacologica Sinica
 African Journal of Pharmacy and Pharmacology
 Anticancer Drugs
 BioEssays
 BioTechniques
 BMC Cancer
 BMC Microbiology
 Breast Cancer Research
 Breast Cancer Research and Treatment
 Breast Disease
 British Journal of Cancer
 Cancer Cell International
 Cancer Investigation
 Cancer Research
 Cancer Therapy
 Clinical Breast Cancer
 Clinical Cancer Research
 Clinical Chemistry
 Endocrine-Related Cancer
 Experimental Biology and Medicine
 Gene
 International Journal of Cancer
 International Journal of Radiation Oncology, Biology, Physics
 In Vitro Cellular & Developmental Biology – Animal
 Journal of Cellular and Molecular Medicine
 Journal of Plant Breeding and Crop Science
 Medical Principles and Practice
 Medicinal Chemistry
 Molecular Cancer Therapeutics
 Molecules
 Nature Protocols
 Oncogene
 Pharmacogenomics
 PLoS ONE
 The Breast

External links 
Free access to "Relevance of breast cancer cell lines as models for breast tumours: an update"
Free access to "Gene regulation by phorbol 12-myristate 13-acetate in MCF-7 and MDA-MB-231, two breast cancer cell lines exhibiting highly different phenotypes"
Free access to "Estrogen receptor of primary breast cancers: evidence for intracellular proteolysis"
Free access to "Stable 'portrait' of breast tumors during progression: data from biology, pathology and genetics"
Free access to "P53 and breast cancer, an update"
Free access to "Persistent use of ‘‘false’’ cell lines"
Free access to "Significance, detection and markers of disseminated breast cancer cells"
Free access to "Disseminated tumor cells: detection, markers and prognostic/predictive significance"
Free access to "Hereditary breast cancer: an update on genotype and phenotype"
Free access to "Establishment and characterization of three new breast-cancer cell lines"
Free access to "Estrogen Receptor Alpha: Impact of Ligands on Intracellular Shuttling and Turnover Rate in Breast Cancer Cells"
Université libre de Bruxelles – Marc Lacroix

1963 births
Living people
People from Verviers
Walloon people
Academic staff of the Université libre de Bruxelles
Belgian biochemists
Cancer researchers
University of Liège alumni